A chip pan is a deep-sided cooking pan used for deep-frying. Chip pans are named for their traditional use in frying chips (called "French fries" in the United States).

Today, they are made from either aluminium or stainless steel, although in the past were commonly made from cast iron.  A basket is placed inside the pan, to lower the chips into the hot cooking oil, and to raise them once cooked.

Chip pans are commonly used in the United Kingdom and Republic of Ireland, although are slowly being rendered obsolete by deep fryers.

Manufacture 

Chip pans are commonly manufactured through a spinning process, as the metal used is malleable.  The lid is typically stamped out by a die in a heavy press.

Health issues

Repeated heating of oil is believed to greatly increase the free radicals in the oil, leading to a higher risk of heart disease.

Oil burns

Injuries, particularly to children, caused by the hot oil from a chip pan falling on them are a common cause of hospital admission in the UK.

Fire hazard

Chip pans are the most common cause of house fires in the United Kingdom, with around 12,000 chip pan fires every year, 1,100 of them considered serious, resulting in over 4,600 injuries, and 50 deaths per year.  British Fire Brigades frequently issue warnings and advice, urging households to switch to a safer means of cooking chips, and advising that unless the fire is easily contained to leave the fire to the emergency services. Several fire brigades have offered a "chip pan amnesty", trading old chip pans for a deep fryer.

Chip pans account for one-fifth of all domestic fires in the Republic of Ireland. After two men died in a 2016 fire in Cork City, a coroner recommended the sale of chip pans be banned and old chip pans be disposed of. Another coroner noted the danger of people heavily inebriated by alcohol putting on a chip pan and falling asleep. In 2015, at a halting site in Carrickmines, eleven people were killed in a chip pan fire, the worst fire in Ireland for 34 years.

Attempts to extinguish oil fires with water result in a boilover: an extremely dangerous condition whereby the flaming oil is violently expelled from the container in a fireball.

Prevention
Measures to prevent chip fires include:
not using chip pans (making oven chips, microwave chips, or frying in a thermostat-controlled electric deep fryer)
not using chip pans when feeling unwell, or after having taken alcohol or other drugs
not filling the pan more than 1/3 full; frying food in small amounts
not leaving the pan unattended, even if the phone or doorbell rings
turning the handle to the side so as not to accidentally knock it (but not over another hot ring)
if the oil or fat starts to smoke, not adding food, turning off the heat immediately, and waiting for it to cool
drying food before adding it to the oil, including removing any ice
adding a small piece of food to test the temperature; if it crisps quickly, the oil is already hot enough

Some local fire services will supply free deep-fryers. Electric deep fryers feature thermostat-controlled internal heating elements that prevent the oil being heated to the point of ignition.

Dealing with a chip pan fire
Mitigation includes:
 Not moving the pan
 Turning off the heat, if it can be done safely. Leaning over the fire to reach the controls is unsafe. 
If the cooker is electric, cutting off the power supply will turn off the heat. The power can be cut at the fuse box or breaker box, or at the electricity meter.
 Not trying to put out the fire
 Not adding water (which can cause a boilover fireball)
 Not using a fire extinguisher (it can physically push the oil out of the pan, spreading the fire)
 Getting everyone out of the room, closing the door, getting everyone out of the house, and then calling the fire department

Deprecated countermeasures

Water
Attempts to extinguish oil fires with water result in a boilover: an extremely dangerous condition whereby the flaming oil is violently expelled from the container in a fireball.

Extinguishers
Cooking oil fires (Europe class F, US class K) burn hotter than other typical combustible liquids, rendering the standard class A & B fire extinguishers ineffective and even dangerous.  Class F fire extinguishers featuring a yellow label use saponification to put out chip pan fires by spraying an alkaline solution which reacts with the fat to make non-flammable soap. These extinguishers are generally only available in industrial and commercial kitchens.

Fire blankets
After initial investigation in 2013, and later in 2014, the Netherlands Food and Consumer Product Safety Authority issued a statement that fire blankets should never be used to extinguish an oil/fat fire such as a chip pan fire, even if the icons or text on the blanket indicates the blanket may be used in such a case. This includes fire blankets which have been tested according to BS EN 1869. In the investigation out of the 22 tested fire blankets, 16 of the fire blankets themselves caught fire. In the other 6 the fire reignited when the blanket was removed after 17 minutes. The Dutch Fire Burn foundation reported several accidents involving the use of fire blankets when extinguishing oil/fat fires. Consumers may send in their existing fire blankets, which will then receive a sticker stating 'niet geschikt voor olie- en vetbranden' ("not suitable for oil- and fat fires"). New products will have this text printed, rather than stickered.

See also
 List of cooking vessels

References

External links

Online copy of an Oxfordshire council safety flyer (PDF document)
Photo story of a chip pan fire
BBC News - A woman pulled from a chip pan fire thanks her rescuers
North Yorkshire Fire Service - demonstration of a chip pan fire

Cooking vessels
British culture
Firefighting
Types of fire